Igor Tomašić (born 14 December 1976) is a former naturalized Bulgarian footballer of Croatian ethnicity who played as a defender.

Career

Youth career
His first club was Moslavina Kutina, where he trained his football abilities between 1988 and 1994.

Levski Sofia
Tomašić joined Levski on a free transfer in early 2005. He plays in the centre of defense, when there are corners or free kicks he joins his teammates in attack. With Levski Sofia he reached 1/4 finals of UEFA Cup in 2005–06. He scored the goal that put Levski through to the 1/4 finals of the UEFA Cup against Udinese AC. Next season, Levski Sofia with Tomašić, reached the group-stage of UEFA Champions League, becoming the first Bulgarian team that reached the groups.

Maccabi Tel Aviv F.C.
He left Levski Sofia on 19 May 2008 as a free agent. At the same day he became a player of the Israel side Maccabi Tel Aviv FC.

On 16 June 2010 Tomasic was released from Maccabi Tel Aviv FC.

International career
Tomašić has Bulgarian citizenship and debuted for the Bulgaria national football team in the 0–0 draw against Wales in Swansea in August 2006. He has participated in Euro 2008 qualifying matches as well as in 2010 World Cup qualifiers. His final international was a June 2009 World Cup qualification match against the Republic of Ireland.

Personal
Tomašić married his wife Vanessa in June 2008. The couple's first daughter, Alegra, was born on 8 August 2009. He also has another daughter and a son who was born in 2013.

Honours
 Bulgarian Cup 2005, 2007
 Champion of Bulgaria 2006, 2007
 Bulgarian Supercup 2005, 2007
 UEFA Cup 2005-06: 1/4 finals
 UEFA Champions League 2006-07: Group-stage
 Toto Cup 2009

References

External links
 
 Player page on PFCLevski.eu
 Official player website from LEVSKI2004
 International caps in detail  

1976 births
Living people
People from Kutina
Naturalised citizens of Bulgaria
Bulgarian people of Croatian descent
Association football defenders
Croatian footballers
Bulgarian footballers
Bulgaria international footballers
GNK Dinamo Zagreb players
Roda JC Kerkrade players
MVV Maastricht players
K.R.C. Genk players
Hapoel Petah Tikva F.C. players
Hapoel Be'er Sheva F.C. players
PFC Levski Sofia players
Maccabi Tel Aviv F.C. players
Kavala F.C. players
Anorthosis Famagusta F.C. players
Eredivisie players
Belgian Pro League players
Israeli Premier League players
First Professional Football League (Bulgaria) players
Super League Greece players
Cypriot First Division players
Bulgarian expatriate footballers
Expatriate footballers in the Netherlands
Bulgarian expatriate sportspeople in the Netherlands
Expatriate footballers in Belgium
Bulgarian expatriate sportspeople in Belgium
Expatriate footballers in Israel
Bulgarian expatriate sportspeople in Israel
Expatriate footballers in Greece
Bulgarian expatriate sportspeople in Greece
Expatriate footballers in Cyprus
Bulgarian expatriate sportspeople in Cyprus